Tsui Tak is one of the 35 constituencies in the Eastern District.

The constituency returns one district councillor to the Eastern District Council, with an election every four years. The seat is currently held by Lee Chun-keung.

Tsui Tak is loosely based on Bayview Park, Koway Court, New Jade Garden, Walton Estate and Yee Tsui Court in Chai Wan with an estimated population of 12,568.

Councillors represented

Election results

2010s

References

Chai Wan
Constituencies of Hong Kong
Constituencies of Eastern District Council
1999 establishments in Hong Kong
Constituencies established in 1999